Bulat Abilov (Bolat Muqyshuly Ábilov) was the Deputy Chairman of the Otan political party in Kazakhstan. He achieved this position following the death of Parliamentary Speaker and Deputy Chairman Marat Ospanov.

In 2011, as leader of the All National Democratic Party Azat, Abilov referred to as "a political game" a plan by President Nursultan Nazarbayev to sell to the public discounted shares of oil stock KazMunaigas Exploration and Development, the production subsidiary of KMG, Kazakhstan's state oil company.  Abilov said, "Rich people will buy the shares as usual, but ordinary Kazakhs will not participate."

References

External links 
 2002 election controversy
 Kazakh oppositionists enter sixth day Of hunger strike

1957 births
Living people
Fatherland (Kazakhstan) politicians
Ak Zhol Democratic Party politicians
Members of the Mazhilis